The Iosefin Water Tower is an industrial monument in Timișoara, Romania. It was one of the sources of water supply in Timișoara at the beginning of the 20th century. It is classified as a national heritage site (Romanian: monument istoric) with LMI code TM-II-m-A-06152.

History 

The Iosefin Water Tower was built between December 1912 and September 1913 by the Budapest company of János Lenarduzzi, as part of the drinking water distribution network of Timișoara, which also included its twin water tower in Fabric. A tower cost over 200,000 kroner at the time. The two served as reservoirs, which were permanently filled with water to maintain the same water pressure everywhere in the city and to supply households for 3–4 hours, in case of repairs of malfunctions. In their premises were the employees' residences and a telephone station through which they communicated with the water plant.

Just like the Fabric Water Tower, its superior level is equipped with a drinking water tank of 500 m3, but it also has an industrial water tank (from the Bega River) of 250 m3 situated at an inferior level. 

Until 2012, it was owned by Aquatim (the company that manages the water supply and sewerage of Timișoara), after which it was taken over by the city hall. Before this, former mayor Nicolae Robu tried to sell the tower to private individuals, but local councillors struck down the project amid public uproar. Later, in 2018, the city hall announced its plans of setting up a small cultural café and a coffee museum inside the tower, dedicated to Francesco Illy, a Timișoara-born businessman who invented an espresso machine. The Iosefin Water Tower was included in 2020 in a large-scale, EEA and Norway Grants-funded project aiming at its transformation into a permanent cultural center with a café, an exhibition hall, a foyer and a belvedere. The rehabilitation works started in the fall of 2021.

References

See also 

 Fabric Water Tower

Buildings and structures in Timișoara
Historic monuments in Timiș County
1913 establishments in Romania
Water towers in Romania
Towers completed in 1913